Tom Cully, professionally known as Jamie Isaac, is an English singer, songwriter  and producer, born and raised in Croydon 

Signed to House Anxiety /Marathon Artists, Isaac's debut EP, I Will Be Cold Soon, attracted attention for its near-choral incantations, minimalist jazz tones and post-rock layering. Isaac has been praised for using the power of silence with experimental and enveloping swaggering beats and his self-aware lyrics. His second EP, Blue Break, gained recognition for its soulful, piano-led sound. Featuring Jamie in The Guardian's New Music, Michael Cragg praised "Blue Break" for "favouring space and atmosphere over production histrionics".

In the run up to the release of his debut album Couch Baby, Isaac presented the 'Loose Grip' Mixtape, a series of remixes of tracks taken from the album featuring collaborations with Rejjie Snow, King Krule under the moniker Edgar The Beatmaker, Jesse James Solomon, Jadasea, Black Mack, and Mr Malarky.

In January 2018, Jamie released 'Doing Better' followed by 'Wings' in March. He then announced the title of his next album (04:30 Idler), which was released on 1 June 2018. His latest single '(04:30) Idler / Sleep' was released on 23 May 2018.

Background 
Jamie Issac was born on 2 July 1994 in Croydon, United Kingdom. He attended the BRIT School alongside King Krule, the two have worked on many projects together since. He started making his own music in 2011 in his parents home, and released a few online demos.   After a friend of his invited him to do a few sessions in a studio, his music advanced rapidly, with people expressing an interest in his music. Jamie has always had an interest in film-making and script writing, saying that if it weren't for music, those are the careers he probably would have pursued. 

His influences come from jazz pianists such as Dave Brubeck, Bill Evans and Teddy Wilson and classical pianist Chopin as well as The Beach Boys.

Jamie describes his own music style as "brooding, cinematic and minimalist" and that he would never write a song without a piano line in it. He has released two EP's, namely 'I Will be Cold Soon' and 'Blue Break', both of which have become well known.

In March 2017, he released Couch Baby (Revisited) featuring new track Un-thinkable and remixes from Wiki, Denzel Curry and Rejjie Snow among others.

In January 2018, Jamie announced the title of his next single 'Doing Better' on Instagram and later on posted a video on Twitter in the studio with the caption 'Mastering the album was up till 6am making sure this was perfect I need sleep'. The video for 'Doing Better' was released on 8 February 2018 and single released on 9 February 2018. Since then, the singles 'Wings' and 'Maybe' have been released, both with accompanying music videos. The album (4:30 Idler) is due for release on 1 June 2018.

On 17 January 2018, Jamie announced he was going to be joining Nick Hakim on his six-date UK tour in February 2018.

Discography

Album

EP

Mixtape

References

External links 
 Video – Softly Draining Seas Premiere
 Video – She Dried Premiere
 Video – Loose Grip Mixtape

Living people
Musicians from London
People educated at the BRIT School
People from Croydon
21st-century English singers
Year of birth missing (living people)